The Not So Secret Life of the Manic Depressive: 10 Years On is a documentary by Stephen Fry. It was broadcast on the BBC in February 2016. It is a 10-year follow-up to The Secret Life of the Manic Depressive. In this documentary, Fry looked at how attitudes and awareness around mental health have changed in the intervening 10 years.

References

External links
 

2016 in British television
2016 television specials
BBC television documentaries
Bipolar disorder
British television documentaries
English-language television shows
Stephen Fry